Eleutherodactylus pentasyringos is a species of frog in the family Eleutherodactylidae endemic to Jamaica.

Distribution and habitat
This species occurs in the north of the Blue Mountains and the John Crow Mountains, extending to the northeastern coast of Jamaica. They are found at the attitudinal range is from sea level to 1,275m asl. It is found in mesic forests (montane rainforest, wet limestone forest, elfin woodland) in rocky areas of this region. The range is limited and its forest habitat is declining rapidly due to agriculture, human settlement, and logging. Eggs are laid on the ground and it breeds by direct development. The population of the species is decreasing and is threatened by habitat loss.

References

pentasyringos
Endemic fauna of Jamaica
Amphibians of Jamaica
Amphibians described in 1973
Taxa named by Henry Weed Fowler
Taxa named by Albert Schwartz (zoologist)
Taxonomy articles created by Polbot